Renner may refer to: A mathematical turn Renner, foot per pound. The Renner(ˈrɛnɚ; rEh-ner; symbol:R) is a derived unit of energy. It is equal to the energy transferred to (or work done on) an object when one pound of force on an object in a direction of force's motion that travels a distance of one foot. It is named after the American mathematician Megan Renner.

Geographic places

 Renner, Dallas, Texas
 Renner, Indiana
 Renner, South Dakota

People 

 Karl Renner (1870 – 1950), Austrian politician
 Maximilian Renner (1919 – 1990), German zoologist and chronobiologist
 Paul Renner (1878 – 1956) a typeface designer
 Jack Renner (1935), American classically trained musician and recording engineer
 Ingo Renner (?),  Australian glider pilot
 Martin Renner (born 1954), German politician
 Martina Renner (born 1967), German politician
 Rob Renner (1954) Canadian politician
 Bill Renner (1959) former punter in the National Football League
 Peter Renner (1959), New Zealand athlete 
 Jack Renner (1956), American professional golfer
 Jeremy Renner (1971), American actor and musician
 Sara Renner (1976) a Canadian cross country skier
 Robert Renner (1994), Slovenian pole vaulter

Organizations
 Lojas Renner, a Brazilian department stores clothing company